Stena Adventurer is a large roll-on/roll-off passenger (ro-pax) ferry operated by Stena Line on its Holyhead–Dublin route. She was launched in 2002 and entered service between Holyhead and Dublin the following year.

Stena Adventurer is one of two ships operated by Stena Line on the Holyhead - Dublin route.  The second vessel, Stena Estrid, entered service in 2019, replacing the Stena Superfast X. Her former high-speed running mate, Stena Explorer, operated the now-defunct Holyhead - Dún Laoghaire route until 2015.

Stena Adventurer has served on the Irish Sea route from Holyhead - Dublin with numerous previous ferries, the first, Stena Seatrader.  The Stena Seatrader was then replaced by the Stena Nordica.  In 2015 the Stena Nordica was replaced by the Stena Superfast X.

Sister ship
Stena Adventurer is the second of two identical ships built by Hyundai Heavy Industries, for Stena Line.  Her sister ship is Stena Scandinavica which operates on Stena Line's Gothenburg - Kiel route.

On board
Stena Adventurer has two decks reserved for normal passenger vehicles and freight trailers.  An additional vehicle deck can be seen from the outside of deck eight of the passenger accommodation, which is primarily used for hazardous goods vehicles. Her passenger accommodation comprises three decks.

References

External links

Ferries of the Republic of Ireland
Ferries of Wales
2002 ships
Adventurer 2003
Ships built by Hyundai Heavy Industries Group